G magazine is a bi-monthly Australian consumer sustainability magazine, published in Sydney. The first issue of G magazine went on sale in November 2006, and G-Online went live in September 2008.

The publication was launched and published by Luna Media, and purchased by Next Media (previously Wolseley Media) in January 2009.

Editorial advisors include Sir Richard Branson, British entrepreneur; Patrice Newell, author and former TV presenter; Nick Rowley, a former climate change advisor to Tony Blair; Jon Dee, founder and chairman of the Australian advocacy organisation Do Something! and co-founder of Planet Ark; and Maria Atkinson, co-founder of the Green Building Council and global head of sustainability for Lend Lease.

Awards
At the 2006 Bell Awards for Publishing Excellence, Luna Media was named Best Small Publisher.

At the 2007 Bell Awards, G won Consumer Magazine of the Year (print run over 30,000) and Best Magazine Launch. It was also commended for its editorial, design, publishing, and advertising sales.

At the 2008 Bell Awards, G-Online, won Best Internet Site for G-Online from the Bell Awards for Publishing Excellence. Also in 2008, Sara Phillips won Editor of the Year award, and Best Magazine Supplement for September The Green Book. The magazine's publisher, Luna Media, won the inaugural Sustainability in Publishing award.

Also in 2008, Luna Media was also awarded both the inaugural Lord Mayor's Sustainability Award and Environmental Business Award at the City of Sydney Business Awards.

Sections
 Trailblazers: Short articles about people and organizations working on sustainability
 G People: Interviews with people in the environmental movement
 Instant Expert: Quick summary of an environmental issue
 Versus: Compares items to see which is the more environmentally friendly
 General features: Long-form articles
 Department features: Food, Garden, Health and Wellbeing, Home, Kids
 Travel: Ecologically friendly travel
 By The Numbers: Statistics on environmental issues

External links
G magazine.

2006 establishments in Australia
Lifestyle magazines published in Australia
Bi-monthly magazines published in Australia
Environmental magazines
Magazines established in 2006
Magazines published in Sydney